Skrivena Luka (literally "Hidden Harbor" in Croatian), known by locals as Portorus, is a small village in Croatia. It is located on the southern shore of the island of Lastovo and belongs to the eponymous municipality within Dubrovnik-Neretva County in the south of the country.

The Struga Lighthouse was built in 1839 at the mouth of Skrivena Luka Bay. It is one of the oldest lighthouses in Croatia, located 70 metres above the sea, on the edge of a steep cliff. The light from Struga is seen 20 miles away and it warns ships that they are close to Lastovo. 

Within the bay it is possible to see Gorgonia coral and peregrine falcons.

References

Populated places in Dubrovnik-Neretva County
Populated coastal places in Croatia
Lastovo